William Lacy or Bill Lacy could refer to: 

William Lacy (Catholic priest) (died 1582), English Catholic priest and martyr
William Henry Lacy (1858-1925), American Methodist missionary to China
William S. B. Lacy (1910-1978), American Diplomat
Bill N. Lacy (born 1933), American academic
William H. Lacy Jr. (1945-2016), American businessman
Bill Lacy (political operative), Director of the Robert J. Dole Institute of Politics

See also
William Lacey (disambiguation)
William Lacy Clay Sr. (born 1931), better known as Bill Clay, U.S. Congressman from Missouri
William Lacy Clay Jr. (born 1956), better known as Lacy Clay, U.S. Congressman from Missouri and son of Bill Clay